Cora Mildred Maris Clark (3 March 1885 – 30 June 1967) was a New Zealand hockey player and administrator, nurse. She was born in Auckland, New Zealand on 3 March 1885.

References

1885 births
1967 deaths
New Zealand nurses
New Zealand female field hockey players
New Zealand women nurses
Field hockey players from Auckland